Human Hurricane is one of many compilations featuring 1970s material of American doom metal band Pentagram. It was released by Downtime Records in 1998. A vinyl version, retitled If the Winds Would Change (featuring tracks 2, 3, 4, 6, 8, 9, 10, 12, 15 and 17), was released in 2011 by High Roller Records.

Track listing

Lineup
Bobby Liebling – vocals
Vince McAllister – guitar
Greg Mayne – bass
Geof O'Keefe – drums
Ranny Palmer – second guitar on "Livin' in a Ram's Head"
Marty Iverson – second guitar on "Starlady" and "Much Too Young to Know"

References

Pentagram (band) compilation albums
1998 compilation albums